Atle Roll-Matthiesen (9 August 1906 – 1990) was a Norwegian judge.

He was born in Aurland to physician Alf Matthiesen and Laura Roll. He graduated as cand.jur. in 1927, and was named as a Supreme Court Justice from 1958.

References

1906 births
People from Aurland
Supreme Court of Norway justices
1990 deaths